Svinaře is a municipality and village in Beroun District in the Central Bohemian Region of the Czech Republic. It has about 900 inhabitants.

Administrative parts
Villages of Halouny and Lhotka are administrative parts of Svinaře.

References

Villages in the Beroun District